Ali Fathollahzadeh Khoei (born 9 January 1959 in Khoy, West Azerbaijan Province) is an Iranian businessman and football administrator, who is currently the chairman of the Esteghlal F.C. He is also the formerly managing-director of Esteghlal Javan Newspaper.

Esteghlal F.C.
He was elected as chairman of the Esteghlal on 10 May 1996 and was in office until his term ended on 10 May 2003. On 1 May 2007, he was reelected; but resigned on 15 September 2008 due to poor results in the Iran Pro League. He came back to the club after reelection on 1 June 2010 as chairman. During his term as president of the club, he bought big stars like Farhad Majidi from Bahman, Arash Borhani from Pas Tehran, Rasoul Khatibi from Hamburg SV, Milad Meydavoudi from Esteghlal Ahvaz, Karrar Jassim and Andranik Teymourian from Tractor Sazi, Mehdi Rahmati and Khosro Heydari from Sepahan and also Javad Nekounam from Osasuna.

Trophies won by club during presidency
  Iranian Football League (2): , 2000–01, 2012–13
  Hazfi Cup (4): 1999–00, 2001–02, 2007–08, 2011–12
Iranian Super Cup (1): 2022
 AFC Champions League: Runner-up (1): 1999 & Third place (1): 2002

Electoral history

References

External links
alifathollahzade on Instagram

1959 births
Living people
Iranian football chairmen and investors
People from Khoy
Iranian sports executives and administrators
Iranian sportsperson-politicians